Andreas Skouras (born 1972 in Thessaloniki) is a Greek-German pianist and harpsichordist.

Life 
Skouras attended the Odeon in Thessaloniki and studied at the Hochschule für Musik und Theater München with Hedwig Bilgram, Ketil Haugsand,  and Lars Ulrik Mortensen. As a pianist and harpsichordist, he has performed solo, in song duets and with orchestra] in concert halls and festivals worldwide. He has played with the Ensemble intercontemporain, the ASKO Ensemble and the English Chamber Orchestra, among others. In addition, he has been involved in CD, radio and television productions.

Skouras' repertoire includes baroque, classical and Romantic music pieces. He is also particularly interested in works by Greek composers, for example Khoai by Iannis Xenakis, one of the most demanding pieces for harpsichord. Skouras taught harpsichord at the Hochschule für Musik und Theater in Munich and gave master classes at the Tbilisi State Conservatoire.

Awards 
 2003: Bayerischer Kunstförderpreis.
 2007: Stipendium für Musik der Landeshauptstadt München.

Recordings 
 2005: Sonaten und Sonatinen by Joseph Haydn and Fredrik Schwenk (Cavalli)
 2016: Complete Works For Piano Solo by Bernd Alois Zimmermann (Neos)
 2016: Chamber Music For Violin, Piano And Harpsichord by Charles Wuorinen with Anne Skouras (Neos)
 2016: Ins Offene – Klaviermusik Der Moderne (Neos)
 2017: Piano Works by Kalevi Aho (Neos)
 2017: Complete Works For Piano & Harpsichord by Anders Eliasson (Neos)
 2018: Wolfgang Jacobi 125 – Live @ Megève Festival Savoy Truffle (Neos)
 2018: Domenico Scarlatti And The Modern Era Of The Harpsichord (Neos)

References

External links 
 
 
 

German classical pianists
Classical accompanists
German harpsichordists
1972 births
Living people
Musicians from Thessaloniki